Else is a surname. Notable people with the surname include:

Anne Else (born 1945), New Zealand writer and editor
Chris Else (born 1942), New Zealand author
 Craig Else (born 1964), Canadian guitarist, composer, vocalist, and record producer
 Dirk Else (born 1977), retired German ski jumper
 Gerald Else (1908–1982), American classicist
 Jean Else (born 1951), disgraced British educator and the first person to have a Damehood revoked